A Vendor on Premises (VOP) is defined as on site coordination of a customer's temporary help services through an exclusive, long-term general contractor relationship with a temporary help company. The designated VOP may enter subcontracting relationships with other temporary help suppliers, or relationships may be specified by the customer.

See also
 Contingent workforce
 Vendor management system
 Managed service provider
 Employment agency
 Human resource management
 Professional employer organization (PEO)

References

Human resource management